Innocent Ufoma Melkam (born 26 May 1981) is a Nigerian former professional footballer who played as a midfielder.

Career
In July 1999, Melkam joined SG Wattenscheid 09, a Regionaliga club in Germany where he played for two years. In 2001, he left for Karlsruher SC's reserve Oberliga team and earned ten caps with the 2. Bundesliga team. With the reserve team, he played 76 games and scored 14 goals. In January 2005, he joined SV Langenberg and remained until May 2005. He then moved over to Hammer SpVg (2005–2007), whom he helped gain promotion into the Oberliga in 2006.

After the 2006–07 season, Melkam moved to the China League One, but was unfortunate because the club Hohhot Black Horse of Tibet was banned by the Chinese FA for rules violation. He later made a brief switch to Shanghai East Asia F.C. (China League One) in February 2008.

Melkam returned to Germany in January 2009 and played a half season for SUS Niederbonsfeld.

Personal life
Melkam was born in Lagos, Nigeria. He holds both Nigerian and German citizenship.
  
His elder brother Gabriel Melkam is a left sided midfielder who played for Changchun Yatai in China.

References

External links
 
 

Living people
1981 births
Association football midfielders
Nigerian footballers
German footballers
2. Bundesliga players
Karlsruher SC II players
Karlsruher SC players
SG Wattenscheid 09 players
Hammer SpVg players
Nigerian expatriate footballers
Nigerian expatriate sportspeople in Germany
Expatriate footballers in Germany
Nigerian expatriate sportspeople in China
Expatriate footballers in China